In mathematics, specifically group theory, a subgroup series of a group  is a chain of subgroups:

where  is the trivial subgroup. Subgroup series can simplify the study of a group to the study of simpler subgroups and their relations, and several subgroup series can be invariantly defined and are important invariants of groups.  A subgroup series is used in the subgroup method.

Subgroup series are a special example of the use of filtrations in abstract algebra.

Definition

Normal series, subnormal series
A subnormal series (also normal series, normal tower, subinvariant series, or just series) of a group G is a sequence of subgroups, each a normal subgroup of the next one. In a standard notation

There is no requirement made that Ai be a normal subgroup of G, only a normal subgroup of  Ai +1. The quotient groups Ai +1/Ai are called the factor groups of the series.

If in addition each Ai is normal in G, then the series is called a normal series, when this term is not used for the weaker sense, or an invariant series.

Length
A series with the additional property that Ai ≠ Ai +1 for all i is called a series without repetition; equivalently, each Ai is a proper subgroup of Ai +1. The length of a series is the number of strict inclusions Ai < Ai +1. If the series has no repetition then the length is n.

For a subnormal series, the length is the number of non-trivial factor groups. Every nontrivial group has a normal series of length 1, namely , and any nontrivial proper normal subgroup gives a normal series of length 2. For simple groups, the trivial series of length 1 is the longest subnormal series possible.

Ascending series, descending series
Series can be notated in either ascending order:

or descending order:

For a given finite series, there is no distinction between an "ascending series" or "descending series" beyond notation. For infinite series however, there is a distinction: the ascending series

has a smallest term, a second smallest term, and so forth, but no largest proper term,  no second largest term, and so forth, while conversely the descending series

has a largest term, but no smallest proper term.

Further, given a recursive formula for producing a series, the terms produced are either ascending or descending, and one calls the resulting series an ascending or descending series, respectively. For instance the derived series and lower central series are descending series, while the upper central series is an ascending series.

Noetherian groups, Artinian groups
A group that satisfies the ascending chain condition (ACC) on subgroups is called a Noetherian group, and a group that satisfies the descending chain condition (DCC) is called an Artinian group (not to be confused with Artin groups), by analogy with Noetherian rings and Artinian rings. The ACC is equivalent to the maximal condition: every non-empty collection of subgroups has a maximal member, and the DCC is equivalent to the analogous minimal condition.

A group can be Noetherian but not Artinian, such as the infinite cyclic group, and unlike for rings, a group can be Artinian but not Noetherian, such as the Prüfer group. Every finite group is clearly Noetherian and Artinian.

Homomorphic images and subgroups of Noetherian groups are Noetherian, and an extension of a Noetherian group by a Noetherian group is Noetherian. Analogous results hold for Artinian groups.

Noetherian groups are equivalently those such that every subgroup is finitely generated, which is stronger than the group itself being finitely generated: the free group on 2 or finitely more generators is finitely generated, but contains free groups of infinite rank.

Noetherian groups need not be finite extensions of polycyclic groups.

Infinite and transfinite series
Infinite subgroup series can also be defined and arise naturally, in which case the specific (totally ordered) indexing set becomes important, and there is a distinction between ascending and descending series. If the subgroups are more generally indexed by ordinal numbers, one obtains a transfinite series, such as this ascending series:

Given a recursive formula for producing a series, one can define a transfinite series by transfinite recursion by defining the series at limit ordinals by 
Fundamental examples of this construction are the transfinite lower central series and upper central series.

Other totally ordered sets arise rarely, if ever, as indexing sets of subgroup series. For instance, one can define but rarely sees naturally occurring bi-infinite subgroup series (series indexed by the integers):

Comparison of series
A refinement of a series is another series containing each of the terms of the original series. Two subnormal series are said to be equivalent or isomorphic if there is a bijection between the sets of their factor groups such that the corresponding factor groups are isomorphic. Refinement gives a partial order on series, up to equivalence, and they form a lattice, while subnormal series and normal series form sublattices. The existence of the supremum of two subnormal series is the Schreier refinement theorem. Of particular interest are maximal series without repetition.

Examples

Maximal series
 A composition series is a maximal subnormal series.
Equivalently, a subnormal series for which each of the Ai is a maximal normal subgroup of Ai +1. Equivalently, a composition series is a subnormal series for which each of the factor groups are simple.
 A chief series is a maximal normal series.

Solvable and nilpotent
 A solvable group, or soluble group, is one with a subnormal series whose factor groups are all abelian.
 A nilpotent series is a subnormal series such that successive quotients are nilpotent.
A nilpotent series exists if and only if the group is solvable.
A central series exists if and only if the group is nilpotent.

Functional series
Some subgroup series are defined functionally, in terms of subgroups such as the center and operations such as the commutator. These include:
 Lower central series
 Upper central series
 Derived series
 Lower Fitting series
 Upper Fitting series

p-series
There are series coming from subgroups of prime power order or prime power index, related to ideas such as Sylow subgroups.
 Lower p-series
 Upper p-series

References